Mad About Opera (Italian: Follie per l'opera) is a 1948 Italian musical comedy film directed by Mario Costa and starring Gino Bechi, Gina Lollobrigida, and Carlo Campanini.

It was shot at the Scalera Studios in Rome. The film's sets were designed by the art director Piero Filippone. Footage from the film was late re-incorporated in the 1950 British film Soho Conspiracy.

Plot
In order to raise funds to rebuild a Catholic church in Covent Garden which had been destroyed in The Blitz, a journalist organises a benefit performance with major opera stars appearing.

Cast  
Gino Bechi as  Gino
Gina Lollobrigida as  Dora Scala 
Carlo Campanini as  Carlo Scala 
Constance Dowling as  Margaret Jones
Aroldo Tieri as  Guido Marchi 
Aldo Silvani as Don Antonio Capenna 
Lamberto Picasso as  McLean 
Franca Marzi as  Carmen
Guglielmo Barnabò as  Covent Garden Director
Nico Pepe as  Carlo Scala's Friend
Michele Riccardini as Carlo Scala's Friend
Luigi Almirante as Notary
Arturo Bragaglia as Waiter 
Franco Pesce as  Gennarino
Enrico Luzi as Opera Fanatic
 Achille Majeroni  as Mr. Brown 
Franco Mannino as The Pianist
Beniamino Gigli as   Himself
Maria Caniglia as  Herself
Tito Schipa as  Himself
Tito Gobbi as Himself

References

External links
 

French romantic comedy films
1948 musical comedy films
1948 films
Italian romantic comedy films
Films directed by Mario Costa
Films about classical music and musicians
Films set in London
1940s Italian films
1940s French films